Fortinos is a Canadian supermarket chain that was founded in Hamilton, Ontario. It operates 23 stores across the western Greater Toronto and Hamilton Area. It is owned by Loblaw Companies Limited.

History 

In 1961, Italian immigrant steelworker John Fortino opened his first Fortinos store in Hamilton, Ontario. In 1972, John took on seven partners and opened a second store on Hamilton Mountain. Owing to their growing success, subsequent stores were opened in Hamilton, Burlington and Brampton. 

Fortinos is a European-style 'townsquare' shopping concept (which is experienced in new-store layout (i.e. Rexdale and Vaughan) in which the store is set like a European Street with Bakeshoppe, cheese shoppe, Butchers, Flower Shoppe, etc.; and in some locations allowing the customer to pay in each of those departments. The stores also feature Fortinos Bistro Cafes serving hot Italiano Coffee, baked goods, and fresh- made-to-order wraps and soups. Fortinos slogan is "Your Supermarket with a Heart".

Fortinos became a part of Loblaw Companies Limited in 1988, but still without the No Name Brand (yellow packages) products. During the 1990s, Fortinos focused on the Greater Toronto and Hamilton Area, opening stores in Toronto, North York, Etobicoke, Rexdale, Woodbridge, and Markham. 

John Fortino died of cancer on May 18, 2011 at the age of 76. In 2012 a memorial to the founder was erected at the flagship Mall Road store in Hamilton.

Locations 

23 locations:

See also 

 List of supermarket chains in Canada

References

External links
 

1961 establishments in Ontario
Companies based in Hamilton, Ontario
Retail companies established in 1961
Supermarkets of Canada
Privately held companies of Canada
Canadian companies established in 1961